Cordia dentata, commonly known as white manjack, is a species of flowering plant in the borage family, Boraginaceae.  
It is native to the southern United States, México, Central America, Colombia and Venezuela. In the Caribbean, it is found in Jamaica, Cuba, Virgin Islands and Puerto Rico. It is also found in Madagascar.

References

External links

dentata
Flora of North America
Flora of Central America
Flora of South America